I Feel Good and I'm Worth It is the fourth studio album by Peter Jöback, released in 2002.

Track listing
"She's Like a Butterfly" - 4:04
"Sinner" - 4:18
"Help Somebody" - 4:48
"Freeway" - 4:18
"My Fatal Love" - 4:21
"Crying on the Dancefloor" - 3:54
"This is the Year" - 4:09
"Heal" - 4:41
"Northern Guy" - 3:37
"Time to Get Tacky" - 4:03
"Undress Me" - 4:36
"I'm Gonna Do It" - 4:10
"I Feel Good (and I'm Worth It)" - 3:12

Personnel
Stefan Olsson - bass, guitar
Rickard Nettermalm – drums
Jörgen Ingeström - piano, keyboard

Charts

References

2002 albums
Peter Jöback albums